Louise Brough and Margaret duPont successfully defended their title, defeating Gussie Moran and Pat Todd in the final, 8–6, 7–5 to win the ladies' doubles tennis title at the 1949 Wimbledon Championships.

Seeds

  Louise Brough /  Margaret duPont (champions)
  Gussie Moran /  Pat Todd (final)
  Molly Blair /  Jean Quertier (quarterfinals)
  Joy Gannon /  Betty Hilton (semifinals)

Draw

Finals

Top half

Section 1

Section 2

The nationalities of Mrs FG Downing, Mrs EM Frost and Mrs M Guthrie are unknown.

Bottom half

Section 3

Section 4

References

External links

Women's Doubles
Wimbledon Championship by year – Women's doubles
Wimbledon Championships
Wimbledon Championships